General Alexander Anderson  (7 May 1807 – 21 November 1877) was a senior Royal Marines officer. He served in the Royal Marine Light Infantry and became a Companion of the Order of the Bath. 

Anderson is buried in Brompton Cemetery in London. His memorial is an unusual composition of cannonballs, one of which has disappeared. Three of the cannonballs are inscribed, individually bearing the words 'Beyrout', 'Gaza' and 'Syria'. The grave lies on the east side of the main path, midway between the north entrance and the colonnades.

References

External links

1807 births
1877 deaths
Royal Marines generals
Companions of the Order of the Bath
Burials at Brompton Cemetery
19th-century Royal Marines personnel